Catherine Walsh (born 1964) is an Irish poet.

Biography 
She was born in Dublin, 1964, and grew up there and in rural Wexford. She is the founder and co-editor of hardPressed Poetry with Billy Mills. She lives in Limerick. She served as Holloway Lecturer on the Practice of Poetry at University of California, Berkeley for 2012/13.

Publications
Macula (Dublin, Red Wheelbarrow Press, 1986)
The Ca Pater Pillar Thing and More Besides (Dublin, hardPressed Poetry, 1986)
Making Tents (hardPressed Poetry, 1987)
Short Stories (UK, Twickenham and Wakefield, North & South, 1989)
from Pitch (London, Form Books, 1993)
Pitch (Durham, UK, Pig press, 1994)
Idir Eatortha & Making Tents (London, Invisible Books, 1997)
Etruscan Books Reader No 1 ( Devon, Etruscan Books, 1997)
from City West (Vermont, Longhouse, 1997)
City West (Exeter, UK, Shearsman Books, Ltd, 2005)
Optic Verve (Exeter, UK, Shearsman Books, Ltd, 2009)
Astonished Birds Cara, Jane, Bob and James (hardPressed Poetry, 2012)

References

External links
Bio at Irish Writers Online
Author page on Shearsman site
Poems in Free Verse
Poems on Longhouse site

1964 births
Living people
20th-century Irish poets
21st-century Irish poets
Irish women poets
People from County Dublin
People from County Wexford
Writers from Limerick (city)